Renage is a commune in the Isère department in southeastern France.

Population

See also
Communes of the Isère department

References

External links
Official site

Communes of Isère
Isère communes articles needing translation from French Wikipedia